Shah Beg Arghun (1465 – 1524) (Urdu: شاہ بیگ ارغون) was the son of Zunnun Beg Arghun. He was the commander-in-chief and head of the nobles at the court of Sultan Hussain Mirza King of Khurasan and Governor of Kandahar in 1488, after the invasion of Babur in Kabul and Kandahar. 

When Babur invaded the province of Qandhar Shah Beg Arghun unable to resist him retreated towards Shal and Sibi. He stayed at Sibi and built a huge Fort, Sibi Fort and moved towards Sindh and having overcome Jam Feroz the last King of the Samma Dynasty in 1521, He settled himself as king of Sindh. His reign was short-lived, he died in the year 1524 and his eldest son Shah Hussain Arghun succeeded him.

References

1465 births
1524 deaths